Levengi or Lavangi is a national dish of Azerbaijan and is also present in Talysh, and Iranian cuisine. It is a fish or chicken stuffed with walnuts, onions and various condiments and baked in the oven. Lavangi is most prevalent in the Absheron Peninsula of Azerbaijan and in the Lankaran, Lerik, Astara, Masally, Salyan and Neftchala districts. Lavangi is prepared from fish, chicken, duck and aubergine.

Stuffed fish (Balıq ləvəngisi)

Stuffed fish, also called "Balıq ləvəngisi", is usually prepared for Nowruz; The preferred fish is the Caspian kutum, asp or carp of the Caspian Sea, but white fish-beluga can also be suitable.

The ingredients for stuffing include peeled walnuts, chopped and well-fried onions, sour prune or sour cherry or a pomegranate juice syrup called narsharab ("nar" is the local name of pomegranate in Azerbaijan), dried cherry-plums, raisins and vegetable oil. They are mixed with a cup of water, and salt and pepper are also added to taste, if the fish has caviar, it is also used in the filling.

The fish is skinned and washed, and then filled with stuffing after it dries. The belly of the fish is sewed (in order to make the stuffing stay in) and then outside of the fish is rubbed with narsharab or cherry-plum sauce. The fish is baked in the oven until the top of it fries. It is served with pieces of lemon, bread and narsharab.

Stuffed chicken (Toyuq ləvəngisi)

The stuffing is prepared by mincing the onions, squeezing them into a cloth to remove the left over juice and mixing all ingredients (crushed walnuts, onions, raisins, narsharab).The chicken is first wiped with salt and pepper and then stuffed with the mentioned mixture and then sewed. Outside of the chicken is rubbed with vegetable oil and cherry-plum paste and baked in medium oven until turn red.

Then it is served with lemon pieces and simple rice-pilaf, in which the rice is fried in butter and then cooked in chicken broth with sesame, ginger, salt and pepper and served with roasted almonds.

See also
Dolma

References

Azerbaijani cuisine
Iranian cuisine
National dishes
Stuffed dishes